Andrey Andreev (born Andrey Vagnerovich Ogadzhanyants; 3 February 1974) is a multinational tech entrepreneur. He is known for founding the dating and social networking apps Bumble and Badoo, amongst others. In 2019, Andreev sold the apps' holding company, MagicLab, to Blackstone at a $3 billion valuation. In 2020, he founded social audio app Stereo. His previous ventures include SpyLog, Begun, and Mamba.

Early and personal life 
In interviews, Andreev discussed an early interest in communication technology: stating he built a homemade radio at ten years old. 

In 1992, Andreev moved to Valencia, Spain, where he enrolled in university and studied management. In 1995, he dropped out to pursue his first business, Virus. 

In 2005, he moved to London, England, settling in Covent Garden. He became a British citizen in 2008. 

Andreev lists cooking as one of his greatest passions and contributes dishes to the menus of his favorite restaurants. The sweet onion soup 'Andreï Style' at two-Michelin-starred L'Atelier de Joël Robuchon in Covent Garden, London, is named after him.

In 2018, Andreev made the Forbes global list of billionaires for the first time. In August 2022, his net worth was estimated at $2.0 billion.

Career

Early entrepreneurship
In 1995, Andreev founded Virus, an online store selling computers and accessories. In 1997, he sold Virus for an undisclosed amount.

In 1999, Andreev founded the web-tracking business, SpyLog. In 2001, he sold the company for an undisclosed amount. 

In 2002, Andreev founded the digital advertising firm, Begun. In 2003, he sold the majority share of the company to Russian investment firm Finam Holdings and  sold his remaining stake in 2004.

In 2004, Andreev founded the freemium, desktop-based dating site, Mamba. In its first year of operation, Mamba grew to more than 4 million users. In 2006, he sold his stake in the company for an undisclosed amount.

Badoo

In 2006, Andreev launched Badoo, the social networking and photo-sharing app. Initially developed to compete with Facebook, Andrey decided to pivot to dating after the release of the iPhone. The company experienced rapid growth throughout Europe and Latin America, growing to nearly 12 million users within the first year. 

In an article in 2011, Wired described Badoo as a 'mass phenomenon' in Brazil, Mexico, France, Spain, and Italy. By 2019, Badoo had 425 million registered users globally and operated in 190 countries. 

In a 2017 interview, Andreev claimed that Badoo had invented the popular dating application "swipe" feature. Andreev also introduced industry-standard paid features such as “rise up”  and the “lookalike” feature that allows users to search for others who have similar characteristics to their favorite celebrity. In an October 2017 interview with Shortlist magazine, Andreev stated his philosophy and management style is, 'to make people happy.’ describing Badoo’s company culture and the perks they offered including food and parties.

In April 2019, Andreev committed 100% of Badoo’s revenue to restore the Notre Dame Cathedral in Paris following the fire.

Bumble 

In 2014, Andreev contacted former Tinder marketing executive Whitney Wolfe about working together. Andreev initially offered Wolfe a role as Chief Marketing Officer at Badoo, but she refused. He persuaded her to move back into the dating space by offering her funding and access to Badoo's team. In December 2014, they launched Bumble, the women-focused dating app. 

Speaking to The Guardian, Wolfe named Andreev as her biggest mentor in business and that he, "took the chance on her when no one else would", and that "without him, the Bumble journey wouldn’t have been possible."

Per their agreement, Andreev oversaw the company's operations and leveraged Badoo's infrastructure and engineering resources. He also provided USD $10 million in funding and owned 79% of the company. Wolfe served as founder and CEO and owned 20%. 

Bumble was valued at more than $1 billion in November 2017.

MagicLab
In 2019, Andreev launched MagicLab, a holding company that builds and owns dating and social networking apps Badoo, Bumble, Lumen, Chappy, and Hot or Not in partnership with their founders. In November 2019, he sold his shares to Blackstone Group, the largest alternative investment firm in the world, which became a majority owner of MagicLab. At the time of purchase, Bumble and its sister apps were valued at $3 billion. In 2020, MagicLab was renamed Bumble as the parent company of both Bumble and Badoo.

Stereo 
In 2020, after the sale of MagicLab to Blackstone, Andreev launched the social audio app Stereo. The app allows users to interact with live talks via hosting and listening capabilities. The company has offices in London and Los Angeles, with 20 former MagicLab employees involved.

References

Living people
1974 births
Armenian businesspeople
Russian businesspeople in information technology
Businesspeople from Moscow
British billionaires
Russian billionaires
Russian businesspeople in the United Kingdom